Marcel Communeau (11 September 1885 – 26 June 1971) was a French rugby union player, who represented the France national rugby union team. Communeau was the leading French player prior to World War I, representing his country a record 21 times and captaining the side on 13 occasions.

Communeau was inducted to the World Rugby Hall of Fame in a ceremony at Wembley Stadium during the 2015 Rugby World Cup.

References

1885 births
1971 deaths
Sportspeople from Beauvais
French rugby union players
Rugby union fullbacks
France international rugby union players
World Rugby Hall of Fame inductees